Elena Paparizou & Melisses Live was a co-headlining concert tour by Greek contemporary laïka and pop singer Elena Paparizou and the Greek pop band Melisses started in Pafos, Cyprus on July 27, 2012. The acts toured 10 cities in Greece and three in Cyprus, ending in September 2012. The first solo tour for Melisses, it had been after being postponed for a week due to National Cyprus Day and to the economic crisis in Greece.

Background
On June 10, 2012, Elena Paparizou guest-starred on Petro Kostiopoulos's final show, "Vradi." Paparizou and Melisses performed the track "Popular" by Eric Saade as a part of their act. Originally Paparizou and Melisses stated their summer tour would begin in late June; however, tour dates were later changed. Tour dates were publicized on Paparizou and Melisses' official Facebook pages.

Set list

"All The Time
"Baby It's Over"
"Girna Me Sto Htes (Around The Dream Remix)" 
"Porta Gia Ton Ourano"
"To Fili Tis Zois"
"An Ihes Erthi Pio Noris"
"Poios (VMA Unplugged version)"
"Popular"
"Krata Ta Matia Sou Kleista" feat. Melisses
"Treli Kardia" feat. Melisses
"Krifa" by Melisses
"San Kai Sena"
"Iparhi Logos"
"Tha 'Mai Allios"
"I Kardia Sou Petra"
"Anapandites Kliseis"
"Fisika Mazi" feat. Melisses
"O,ti Niotho Den Allazi (Love Me Crazy)"
"Pirotehnimata"
"I Hate Myself"/"Mr. Perfect (Playmen Remix)"
"Mambo!"
"Gigolo"
"Macarena" feat. Melisses
"Ai Se Eu Te Pego" feat. Melisses
"Mesa Sou (VMA Version)" (Melisses feat. Helena Paparizou)
"Abares" feat. Melisses
"My Number One" (Duet with Melisses)
"I Gi Girizei (Duet with Melisses)
"Den Kanei Krio Stin Ellada" (Duet with Melisses)
"An Isouna Agapi"

Tour dates

Performers

Lead performers
Elena Paparizou,  vocals 
Christos Mastoras (Melisses),  vocals

Melisses band members
Musical director: Christos 
Drums: Iakovos 
Bass: Kostas 
Guitar: Thanos

Credits

Performance
 Director: Kostas Kapetanidis
 Art director: Fokas Evangelinos
 Instrumentation/arrangement: Thanasis Hondros, DONK (Niclas Oaulsson and Toni Mavridis)
 LED/lighting designer: Paris Anagnostopoulos
 Sound: Nikos Chronopoulos, Giannis Xidakis, Spathi Eleni
 Choreography: Fokas Evangelinos

Production
 Production arrangement: Andri Orfanidou/Galaxias Paragoges, Kostas Christopoulos/Four Seasons
 Production manager: Gerasimos Sideridis
 Tour manager: Konstantinos Bletsas
 Communications and public relations: Giannis Koutrakis, Hara Zafarika/Piarista O.E.
 Television production: OBVAM AGM
 Video operator and G-LEC engineer: Elias Binieris
 Technicians: Andreas Georgiou, Michalis Petridis, Giorgos Tikou, Alexis Paterlis, Alexis Petraï, Giannis Triandafyllou, Dinos Freskos, Babis Tsakoumatos, Dimitris Andriannos, Gouseff Chalil
 Editing: Tasos Bitsakakis
 Post-production: Art Factory

Personnel
 Make-up: Giannis Marketakis (effex+)
 Hair: Christos Kalaniotis (effex+)
 Styling: Al Giga (Elena Paparizou), Kostas Zisis (dancers)
 Backstage personal management: Filio Zioga, Vergos Michalis

References

External links
 ElenaCentral page on tour

Helena Paparizou concert tours
2012 concert tours
Co-headlining concert tours